"Ain't No Way" is the title of a dance/R&B single by Charisse Arrington. It was the final single released from her debut album The House That I Built. The single charted on the Billboard R&B/Hip Hop Singles chart on April 5, 1997.

Chart positions

References

1997 singles
1997 songs
MCA Records singles
Songs written by Carolyn Franklin